Pavel Nikolayevich Zavalny is a deputy for the United Russia party in the 7th State Duma of the Russian Federation. He is the head of the committee on Energy. He is president of the Russian Gas Society since 2013 and was director general of Gazprom Transgas Yugorsk until May 2012.

Sanctions
In December 2022 the EU sanctioned Pavel Zavalny in relation to the 2022 Russian invasion of Ukraine.

References

21st-century Russian politicians
Living people
1961 births
People from Duminichsky District
Bauman Moscow State Technical University alumni
United Russia politicians
Sixth convocation members of the State Duma (Russian Federation)
Seventh convocation members of the State Duma (Russian Federation)
Eighth convocation members of the State Duma (Russian Federation)